Poil is a commune in the Nièvre department in central France.

Geography
The commune is part of the parc naturel régional du Morvan. The river Alène has its source in the south-western part of the commune.

Demographics
On 1 January 2019, the estimated population was 147.

See also
Communes of the Nièvre department

References

Communes of Nièvre